Velotti is an Italian surname. Notable people with the surname include:

Agustín Velotti (born 1992), Argentine tennis player
Luigi Velotti, Italian coxswain
Maria Velotti (1826–1886), founder of the Suore Francescane Adoratrici della Santa Croce
 Stephen A. Velotti

Italian-language surnames